Danilo Rios Maia Pereira (born June 9, 1988 in Jacobina, Bahia), or simply Danilo Rios, is a Brazilian attacking midfielder who currently plays for Fortaleza Esporte Clube.

External links
 CBF
 sambafoot
 Guardian Stats Centre
 zerozero.pt
 uol.com.br
 futpedia.globo.com

1988 births
Living people
Brazilian footballers
Esporte Clube Bahia players
Grêmio Foot-Ball Porto Alegrense players
Esporte Clube Vitória players
Clube Atlético Mineiro players
Fortaleza Esporte Clube players
Association football midfielders